Ayanna Kim Thomas is an American scientist, author, and cognitive researcher. Her research centers on the intersection of memory and aging, particularly as those fields relate to brain and cognitive science. She is the editor-in-chief of the journal Memory & Cognition.

Early life 
Thomas grew up in New York and attended Catholic school. She later attended Bronx High School of Science.

Education and career 
Ayanna Thomas received her B.A. in African American studies and Psychology from Wesleyan University in 1996 and went on to earn her PhD in Psychology from the University of Washington in 2001. She then completed her post-doctoral work as a National Institute of Aging (NIA) Fellow at Washington University in St. Louis in 2004. 

Her journey to professorship began as a Research Scientist at Washington University in 2004 and transitioned to Assistant Professor at Colby College in the Department of Psychology. In 2007, Thomas became an Assistant Professor at Tufts University. In 2019, Thomas was promoted from Associate Professor to Professor at the Tufts University Department of Psychology. As of 2021, Thomas is the Dean of Research of the School of Arts and Sciences at Tufts University. Thomas is a founding member of the SPARK Society which is devoted to increasing representation in cognitive sciences for underrepresented minorities. 

In 2019 Thomas was named Editor-in-Chief of the journal Memory & Cognition, her term started January 1, 2020.

Research 
Thomas is known for her work in the field of psychology, memory, and cognitive aging. Over her career, Thomas has produced nearly 70 peer-reviewed publications and has published in the Cambridge University Press with the 2020 release of The Cambridge Handbook of Cognitive Aging: A Life Course Perspective. Her research has been covered by several organizations including I Am a Scientist, National Public Radio, CBC News in Canada, and Popular Science.

Selected publications

Honors and awards 
In 2018, Thomas received a Dalmas Taylor Award from the American Psychological Association. She received a mid-career award from the Psychonomic Society in 2021.

References

External links 
, May 5, 2015, video with Thomas
Ayanna Thomas, PhD

Wesleyan University alumni
University of Washington alumni
Tufts University faculty
21st-century American women scientists
Year of birth missing (living people)
Living people
American women psychologists
African-American psychologists
American cognitive psychologists
Washington University in St. Louis fellows